Jaroslav Pospíšil (born 9 February 1981) is a Czech tennis player playing on the ITF Futures Tour and ATP Challenger Tour. On 23 May 2011 he reached his highest ATP singles ranking of World No. 103. The following year, on 1 October 2012, he reached the highest ATP doubles ranking of his career of World No. 115.

To date, Pospíšil has reached 53 singles finals on the ATP Challenger and ITF Futures tours, from which he has won 28 titles. From the same tours, he has won 64 doubles titles after reaching a total of 100 doubles finals.

Career
Predominantly playing on the Challenger and Futures tours, Pospisil has made 7 main draw appearances on the ATP Tour, including the 2011 Wimbledon Championships as his only Grand Slam appearance. His sole win came at the ATP 250 level on the hard courts of the 2013 Erste Bank Open in Vienna, Austria, where despite losing in qualifying, he was granted entry to the tournament proper as a lucky loser and defeated France's Gaël Monfils in the first round, 7–6, 7–5. He was eliminated in the second round by Dominic Thiem.

Coaching
In a coaching role, he hit with Caroline Wozniacki during the 2015 Wimbledon Championships and helped her prepare for her next opponents.

Towards the end of his playing career, he started coaching tennis, becoming the coach of Czech player Vít Kopřiva, although he continued entering some tournaments as a player in his own right too.

Grand Slam performance timeline

Singles

ATP Challenger and ITF Futures finals

Singles: 53 (28–25)

Doubles: 101 (64–37)

References

External links 
 
 

1981 births
Living people
Czech male tennis players
Sportspeople from Prostějov